The 1967–68 New Jersey Americans season was the first season of the franchise in the American Basketball Association (ABA). The Americans finished tied with the Kentucky Colonels for the fourth and final playoff spot. However, due to the Teaneck Armory being booked and the playing surface at Commack Long Island Arena (the future home of the team) being deemed unsuitable, the two teams did not play a one-game playoff, and thus the game was forfeited to the Colonels, giving them the last spot. The team would rebrand as the New York Nets before the next season started.

Draft

Roster

Standings

Game log

Player statistics

Regular season statistics
As of March 20, 1968

|-
| style="text-align:left;"| || 78 ||  || 33.7 || .494 ||  || .697 || 11.0 || 1.2 ||  ||  || 14.7
|-
| style="text-align:left;"| || 41 ||  || 16.9 || .387 || .000 || .721 || 1.6 || 1.4 ||  ||  || 7.7
|-
| style="text-align:left;"| || 12 ||  || 9.8 || .522 ||  || .545 || 3.8 || .0 ||  ||  || 2.5
|-
| style="text-align:left;"| || 12 ||  || 21.8 || .348 ||  || .455 || 7.1 || .9 ||  ||  || 4.7
|-
| style="text-align:left;"| || 19 ||  || 23.1 || .385 || .176 || .644 || 3.7 || 1.9 ||  ||  || 13.8
|-
| style="text-align:left;"| || 74 ||  || 35.6 || .383 || .301 || .829 || 6.8 || 1.9 ||  ||  || 19.4
|-
| style="text-align:left;"| || 55 ||  || 21.7 || .344 || .302 || .625 || 5.9 || .8 ||  ||  || 8.6
|-
| style="text-align:left;"| || 24 ||  || 29.5 || .341 || .000 || .802 || 3.0 || 3.9 ||  ||  || 11.4
|-
| style="text-align:left;"| || 58 ||  || 17.2 || .421 || .375 || .854 || 1.9 || 1.6 ||  ||  || 8.1
|-
| style="text-align:left;"| || 51 ||  || 12.9 || .371 || .000 || .636 || 3.8 || .5 ||  ||  || 3.4
|-
| style="text-align:left;"| || 21 ||  || 21.5 || .374 || .000 || .586 || 4.8 || .5 ||  ||  || 8.3
|-
| style="text-align:left;"| || 76 ||  || 20.5 || .402 || .281 || .826 || 2.5 || 2.0 ||  ||  || 9.6
|-
| style="text-align:left;"| || 78 ||  || 32.3 || .453 || .067 || .635 || 6.7 || 2.7 ||  ||  || 13.3
|-
| style="text-align:left;"| || 70 ||  || 22.7 || .446 || .400 || .708 || 4.7 || .9 ||  ||  || 12.2
|-
| style="text-align:left;"| || 31 ||  || 35.0 || .410 || .000 || .829 || 3.9 || 3.3 ||  ||  || 19.0
|-
| style="text-align:left;"| || 7 ||  || 8.4 || .632 ||  || .778 || 1.3 || .3 ||  ||  || 4.4
|-
| style="text-align:left;"| || 37 ||  || 31.3 || .393 ||  || .714 || 12.9 || 1.5 ||  ||  || 16.0

Awards and honors
1968 ABA All-Star Game selection (game played on January 9, 1968)
 Tony Jackson

References

New Jersey Americans season
New Jersey Nets seasons
New Jersey Americans
New Jersey Americans
Sports in Bergen County, New Jersey
Teaneck, New Jersey